Cornell de Graauw (born February 23, 1951) is a former Dutch ice hockey player. He was born in Bladel.

De Graauw played ten games over the two seasons between 1968 and 1970 with the Kitchener Rangers.  He played professionally in the United States the following year, scoring an assist in his only game with the Fort Wayne Komets and 64 points in 72 games for the Long Island Ducks.

De Graauw spent his Dutch pro career exclusively with Tigers Amsterdam, scoring better than two points a game. He scored an impressive 8 points in five games for the national team at the 1980 Winter Olympics, including two goals against the powerhouse Soviet Union team, and one against Canada.

References

1951 births
Living people
Dutch ice hockey forwards
De Graauw, Corky}
Ice hockey players at the 1980 Winter Olympics
De Graauw, Corky}
Long Island Ducks (ice hockey) players
Olympic ice hockey players of the Netherlands
People from Bladel
Dutch emigrants to Canada
Amstel Tijgers players
Sportspeople from North Brabant